András Herczeg (born 11 July 1956) is a Hungarian football manager and former player, who is currently the manager of Debreceni VSC. He worked as the manager of the Debreceni VSC between 2007 and 2010. He led his team to the groups stages of the Champions League 2009–10 season and to the group stages of the Europa League 2010-11 season. His team reached their zenith by beating Sampdoria 2–0 at the Puskás Ferenc Stadium in 2010.

Managerial career

Debreceni VSC

First era
András Herczeg became the manager of Debreceni VSC in 2007. Debreceni VSC won the Hungarian National Championship I in 2009 and 2010 and the Hungarian Cup in 2008 and 2010. During the management of András Herczeg Debrecen reached their zenith by qualifying for the group stages of the Champions League 2009–10 and in the following year the group stages of the Europa League 2010-11. Herczeg has been the most successful manager of the Debreceni VSC.

After the resignation of Elemér Kondás, Herceg accepted the appointment of the club to manage Debrecen against Gyirmót FC Győr on the third match day of the 2016–17 Nemzeti Bajnokság I season.

Return
On 8 June 2017, Debreceni VSC appointed Herczeg as the manager of the club.

Honours and awards

As a player

Debreceni VSC

Hungarian National Championship II:
 Winners (1): 1978-79
 Third place (1): 1977-78

As a manager

Debreceni VSC
Zilahi Prize: 2011
Youth Manager of the Year:
 Winners (1): 1995
Local Tournament winner with Debreceni SI Youth team:
 Winners (1): 1995
Hungarian National Championship I:
 Winners (5): 2004–05, 2005–06, 2006–07, 2008–09, 2009–10
 Runner up (1): 2007-08
Hungarian Cup:
 Winners (2):  2007–08, 2009–10
 Runner-up (1): 2006-07
Hungarian Super Cup:
 Winners (4):  2005, 2006, 2007, 2009, 2010
 Runner-up (1): 2008
Hungarian League Cup
 Winners (1):  2010
 Runner-up (1): 2008

References

Sources
Debreceni VSC official website 
Nemzetisport.hu magazine 

1956 births
Living people
People from Gyöngyös
Hungarian footballers
Debreceni VSC players
Hajdúböszörményi TE footballers
KCFC-Hajdúszoboszló footballers
Hungarian football managers
Debreceni VSC managers
Association footballers not categorized by position
Nemzeti Bajnokság I managers
Sportspeople from Heves County